Muskowekwan 85-10 is an Indian reserve of the Muskowekwan First Nation in Saskatchewan, Canada. It is 6 kilometres north of Lestock. In the 2016 Canadian Census, it recorded a population of 5 living in 1 of its 2 total private dwellings.

References

Indian reserves in Saskatchewan
Division No. 10, Saskatchewan